Anton Olexandrovych Korynevych (born 13 February 1986, in Kyiv), is a Ukrainian politician. He is a specialist in international humanitarian law, international criminal law, and international energy law.

Biography 

He graduated from Taras Shevchenko National University of Kyiv, Institute of International Relations in 2009. In 2011, he became an associate professor at the Institute of International Relations under the Department of International Law. 

In 2012, he was promoted as the academic secretary of the Special Academic Council of the University of Kyiv. He worked as a deputy director of scientific and pedagogical work, and as an associate professor of the Institute of International Relations

On June 25, 2019, he was appointed presidential representative of Ukraine in Crimea.

References

External links
 Management. Office of the Permanent Representative of the President of Ukraine of the Autonomous Republic of Crimea.

1986 births
Living people
Politicians from Kyiv
Legal scholars
Taras Shevchenko National University of Kyiv, Institute of International Relations alumni
Academic staff of the Taras Shevchenko National University of Kyiv
21st-century Ukrainian lawyers
21st-century Ukrainian politicians
Presidential representatives of Ukraine in Crimea